Ålgård Church is a parish church of the Church of Norway in Gjesdal Municipality in Rogaland county, Norway. It is located in the village of Ålgård. It is the main church for the Ålgård parish which is part of the Jæren prosti (deanery) in the Diocese of Stavanger. The white, concrete church was built in a fan-shaped style in 2015 using designs by the architects René de Groot og Erik Thesen from the firm, Link Arkitektur. The church seats about 500 people.

The church was built in 2015 to replace the Old Ålgård Church (located next door) which was then too small for the congregation. The church was consecrated on 15 March 2015 by the Bishop Erling Johan Pettersen.

On the upper floor is the sanctuary, vestry, two larger meeting rooms, and a smaller room. There is room for 430 people in the sanctuary, but the large doors in the back can be opened up to the entry hall and adjoining rooms, giving the church a maximum capacity of 600. On the lower floor is the  kitchen, dining hall, church offices, seminar rooms, utility rooms, and closets.

See also 
List of churches in Rogaland

References

Gjesdal
Churches in Rogaland
21st-century Church of Norway church buildings
Churches completed in 2015
2015 establishments in Norway